Confrontation Camp is an American rap rock group consisting of Kyle Jason and Public Enemy members Chuck D (under the name Mistachuck), Professor Griff and DJ Lord. The group's debut album, Objects in the Mirror Are Closer Than They Appear, was released on Artemis Records on July 25, 2000.

Sources 
Inside Mista Chuck's Hard Rock Confrontation Camp, Rolling Stone (2000)
[ Allmusic]
Chuck D's Confrontation Camp Leaves Warped Tour, MTV.com

Rap rock groups